Bruxner Highway, and its former western alignment as Bruxner Way, are a  state highway and rural road respectively, located in New South Wales, Australia. The route forms an east–west link across the Northern Tablelands in northern New South Wales, close to the border with Queensland, to the Northern Rivers coast. It was named after Michael Bruxner, NSW Minister for Transport from 1932 to 1941.

Route
Bruxner Way commences at the intersection with Newell Highway in Boggabilla and heads in a south-easterly direction, tracking close to the southern bank of the Macintyre River until it reaches Yetman, then heads east where it reaches the turn-off to Texas (just across the border in Queensland), then continues in an easterly direction, tracking close to the southern bank of the Dumaresq River and Tenterfield Creek until it eventually terminates at an intersection with New England Highway just north of Tenterfield. Bruxner Highway commences at the intersection with Newell Highway in central Tenterfield and continues in an easterly direction through Tabulam until it reaches Casino, where it meets Summerland Way. The highway continues east through Lismore and Alstonville until eventually terminating at an interchange with Pacific Highway in West Ballina.

The speed limits along Bruxner Highway are mostly 100 km/h with 80 km/h on windy sections and 50 km/h in urban areas. The speed limit is 60 km/h through the Lismore urban area with a high volume of traffic. There is a speed camera in the 80 km/h section near the Lismore City and Ballina Shire boundary.

History
The passing of the Main Roads Act of 1924 through the Parliament of New South Wales provided for the declaration of Main Roads, roads partially funded by the State government through the Main Roads Board (later the Department of Main Roads, and eventually Transport for NSW). Main Road No. 63 was declared from Yetman to Boggabilla (and continuing northwards to the state border with Queensland at Goondiwindi, and southwards via Warialda and Bingara to the intersection with Great Northern Highway, today New England Highway, at Tamworth, Main Road No. 64 was declared from the intersection with North Coast Highway (today Pacific Highway) at Ballina, via Lismore and Casino to the intersection with Great Northern Highway at Tenterfield, and Main Road No. 138 was declared from Tenterfield via Bonshaw to the state border with Queensland at Texas. With the passing of the Main Roads (Amendment) Act of 1929 to provide for additional declarations of State Highways and Trunk Roads, these were amended to Trunk Roads 63 and 64 and Main Road 138 on 8 April 1929. Main Road 138 was later extended westwards from Texas to meet Trunk Road 63 at Yetman, with a branch to the state border with Queensland at Texas, on 22 January 1935.

The Department of Main Roads, which had succeeded the MRB in 1932, declared State Highway 16 on 16 March 1938, from the intersection with Pacific Highway at Ballina via Lismore, Casino, Tabluam, Tenterfield, Bonshaw, Yetman and Boggabilla to the state border with Queensland at Goondiwindi, subsuming Trunk Road 64, and most of Main Road 138 from Yetman to Tenterfield; the southern end of Trunk Road 63 was truncated to meet Bruxner Highway at Yetman, and Main Road 138 was truncated from the bridge over the Dumaresq River at Texas to the intersection with Bruxner Highway, as a result. State Highway 16 was named Bruxner Highway on 2 November 1959, in honour of Sir Michael Bruxner, member for Northern Tablelands and Tenterfield from 1920 to 1962, leader of the New South Wales Country Party for almost all that period and Deputy Premier and Minister for Transport from 1932 to 1941.

The passing of the Roads Act of 1993 through the Parliament of New South Wales updated road classifications and the way they could be declared within New South Wales. Under this act, the declaration of Highway 16 from West Ballina was truncated at Tenterfield, and Main Road 462 was declared along the former alignment from Tenterfield via Bonshaw and Yetman to Boggabilla, on 23 April 2010. Main Road 462 was named Bruxner Way in 2011, however much of the road still shows signage as Bruxner Highway, and few signs have been replaced stating its new identity. Bruxner Highway today retains its declaration as Highway 16, from the intersection with New England Highway in Tenterfield to the intersection with Pacific Highway in West Ballina.

Bruxner Highway was signed National Route 44 in 1974, between Ballina and Tenterfield. It was intended that National Route 44 continued to Boggabilla to meet with Newell Highway, however primarily because the highway was administered by local government, as well as a short 4 km unsealed section between Yetman and Boggabilla (going against the route numbering protocol not to sign routes on unsealed roads, since sealed), this part of the highway was never signed as National Route 44. With the conversion to the newer alphanumeric system in 2013, this was replaced with route B60 between Ballina and Tenterfield.

Upgrades
At Alstonville, a 6.5km-long bypass was completed in 2010 at the cost of $44 million. There is a proposal for a fully duplicated highway from the interchange with Pacific Highway to Lismore Airport.

Major intersections

See also

 Highways in Australia
 Highways in New South Wales

References

External links

Highways in New South Wales
Northern Rivers
Northern Tablelands